Ephippiandra tsaratanensis is a species of flowering plant endemic to the Tsaratanana Massif of northern Madagascar.

Description
Ephippiandra tsaratanensis is tree which grows up to 25 meters tall.

Range and habitat
Ephippiandra tsaratanensis is endemic to the Tsaratanana Massif of northern Madagascar. Only two subpopulations are known, with an estimated area of occupancy (AOO) of 8 km2. It is native to high-elevation humid sclerophyllous montane forest and ericoid thicket between 1,800 and 2,500 meters elevation.

Conservation and threats
The species' conservation status is assessed as critically endangered. Although both subpopulations are in Tsaratanana Strict Nature Reserve, it is threatened by habitat loss from illegal logging and agricultural activities.

References

tsaratanensis
Endemic flora of Madagascar
Flora of the Madagascar ericoid thickets
Flora of the Madagascar subhumid forests